Mashenka is a 1942 Soviet drama film directed by Yuli Raizman and starring Valentina Karavayeva and Mikhail Kuznetsov.

Plot
Telegraphist Masha Stepanova (Valentina Karavayeva) is a medical orderly. During a fire drill, she meets the taxi driver Alexey Soloviev (Mikhail Kuznetsov). Not everything works out in their relationship. Due to Alexei getting infatuated with another girl Masha breaks up with him. And although they only happen to meet again later during the Winter War for a few minutes, it seems that everything is still ahead for them.

Cast 
  - Mashenka Stepanova
 Mikhail Kuznetsov - Alexei "Alyesha" Soloviev
 D. Pankratova - Klava
 Vera Altayskaya - Vera
 Georgi Svetlani - Uncle Vasya
 Nikolai Gritsenko - Kolya (uncredited)
 Vladislav Strzhelchik - White Finnish officer (uncredited)
 Aleksey Konsovsky - Muryaga, a young taxi driver (uncredited)
 Yevgeny Samoylov - episode (uncredited)

Awards
1943 - Stalin Prize of Second degree (Yuli Raizman, Yevgeny Gabrilovich, Valentina Karavayeva).

References

External links 

1942 drama films
1942 films
Soviet drama films
Mosfilm films
Soviet black-and-white films
Winter War in popular culture
1940s Russian-language films